Carl Atwood Wiley (December 30, 1918 – April 21, 1985) was an American mathematician and engineer. He is most widely known as the originator of the solar sail concept as well as the inventor of synthetic aperture radar.

Career
Wiley's research work began at the Air Force Aircraft Radiation Lab at Wright Field in 1941. In 1942 he discovered the piezoelectricity of Barium titanate, for which he later was awarded a patent. In 1949 he went to work for as the engineer-in-charge of Goodyear Aerophysics. It was during this time he invented synthetic aperture radar in 1951, patented as "Pulsed Doppler Radar Methods and Means," #3,196,436. That same year Wiley posited the idea of solar sails in a science fiction story published in Astounding Science Fiction magazine entitled Clipper Ships of Space (originally titled Are the Clipper Ships gone forever?). Wiley wrote his story under the pen name of Russel Saunders, an in-group reference to Russel–Saunders coupling not unlike J.J. Coupling, itself a reference to angular momentum. Seven years later Richard L. Garwin developed the first technical specifications for a solar sail. Robert L. Forward credited Wiley for the genesis of the idea in Forward's 1990 patent.  Wiley's research and manuscripts for the story are now housed in the Eaton collection. In 1953 he left Goodyear to found his own company, Wiley Electronics in Phoenix, Arizona until it was bought out in 1962. Following that Wiley worked for North American Aviation and its successor, Rockwell International where he worked on various radar projects including LOCO, SINCO, VOLPHASE, and VOLFRE. In 1978 he went to work at Hughes Aircraft Company where he eventually retired as a chief scientist in the technology division of Hughes' Space and Communications Group. In 1985, IEEE awarded Wiley their Pioneer Award.

See also
 History of synthetic-aperture radar

References

1918 births
1985 deaths
Antioch College alumni
Ohio State University alumni
Science fiction academics
People from Princeton, New Jersey
Writers from New Jersey
20th-century American mathematicians
Synthetic aperture radar